Dauchez is a French surname. Notable people with the surname include:

 Albert Dauchez, French Olympic archer
 André Dauchez (1870–1948), French artist
 Florence Dauchez (born 1964), French journalist and television host

See also
 Daucher

French-language surnames